Badara Tittha Vihara (also Badaratittha, Padaratittha ) is the name of an historic Theravada Buddhist vihara in what is now the modern Tamil Nadu state of India.

In the Gandhavamsa
Badaratittha is known to us from the Gandhavamsa (or Cullagandhavamsa), a 17th-century Pali work by Nandapañña that recounts post-canonical Pali books written in Burma and Ceylon.

The Gandhavamsa states that Badara Tittha Vihara was the dwelling place of Ācariya Dhammapāla, an early Theravadin commentator from Kanchipuram.

References

Buddhism amongst Tamils